Jodine M. Costanzo (born July 1964) is an American television news reporter in Pittsburgh and a former television news anchor in Cleveland, Chicago and Pittsburgh.

Early life and education
A native of Pittsburgh, Costanzo graduated from South Park High School South Park, Pennsylvania.  She earned a degree in communications from Indiana University of Pennsylvania.

During college, Costanzo was an intern at KDKA-TV in Pittsburgh.

Professional career
Costanzo began her broadcasting career working for WDTV-TV in Clarksburg, West Virginia.  She later joined WDTN-TV in Dayton, Ohio.

In early 1992, Costanzo was hired as a reporter at WKYC-TV in Cleveland, Ohio.  She eventually became the co-anchor of a revived noon news program until leaving the station in 1996 to take a job in Chicago.

In August 1996, Costanzo joined WBBM-TV in Chicago as an early morning news anchor, co-anchoring with Joan Lovett.  In November 1996, Costanzo shifted to full-time reporting for WBBM.

In March 1998, Costanzo joined WPXI-TV in Pittsburgh as a weekend anchor and reporter.  After five years as an anchor, she stepped down as a full-time anchor at the end of June 2003 and shifted to full-time reporting.  "I walk away with a heavy heart because I enjoy anchoring the weekends, but I really want to spend more time with my son," she told the Pittsburgh Post-Gazette at the time.  "That's where my priorities are right now."

Personal
Costanzo and her husband, Richard L. "Rick" Downey, have two children and live in Pittsburgh.

References

External links
 IMDB: https://www.imdb.com/name/nm9250793/
 WPXI-TV Profile

1966 births
Living people
Television anchors from Chicago
American television reporters and correspondents